Tau Herculis, a name Latinized from τ Herculis, is a variable star in the northern constellation of Hercules. It has a blue-white hue and is visible to the naked eye at night with an apparent visual magnitude that fluctuates around 3.91. The star is located at a distance of approximately 307 light years from the Sun based on parallax, but it is drifting closer with a radial velocity of −16 km/s.

The stellar classification of Tau Hercules is B5 IV, and it serves as a standard spectrum in the modern Morgan–Keenan (MK) classification. It is estimated to be just 26 million years old with a relatively low projected rotational velocity of 32 km/s. Slowly rotating B-type stars are often chemically peculiar, so the mostly normal spectra of this star suggests we may be viewing it from near pole-on. The abundance of most heavier elements in this star are about 85% of those in the Sun. The star has four times the mass of the Sun and around 3.8 times the Sun's radius. On average, it is radiating 574 times the luminosity of the Sun from its photosphere at an effective temperature of 15,615 K.

During the Hipparcos mission, Tau Hercules was discovered to be a variable star of the slowly pulsating B-type. These are mid-B main sequence stars that vary with a period of about a day; the brightness of Tau Hercules varies by 0.03 magnitude over a period of  days. The radial velocity of the star varies at a different rate than the photometric period, with the object showing both radial and non-radial pulsation modes.

Historical significance and etymology 

Tau Herculis is located within 1° of the precessional path traced across the celestial sphere by the Earth's North pole. It could have served the northern pole star around the year 7400 BCE, a phenomenon which is expected to reoccur in the year 18,400 due to precession.

Its traditional name, Rukbalgethi Shemali, is of Arabic origin and shares certain etymological characteristics with the stars Ruchbah and Zubeneschamali, signifying Hercules' "northern knee".

References 

B-type subgiants
Slowly pulsating B stars

Hercules (constellation)
Herculis, Tau
Durchmusterung objects
Herculis, 022
147394
079992
6092
Rukbalgethi Shemali

ar:ركبة الجاثي الشمالية